Hopewell is an unincorporated community in Blount County, Alabama, United States. It lies at an elevation of 981 feet (299 m).

References

Unincorporated communities in Blount County, Alabama
Unincorporated communities in Alabama